Crypt of the Wizard is a compilation album by Norwegian solo artist Mortiis, released in 1996.

Recorded in Norway, it was initially a series of 5 12" EP singles, with the EPs press run consisting of 1,000 copies.

Recording 
Recording began in January 1996 at Silver Dragoon Studio, Norway,

Track listing
All Songs Written & Arranged By Mortiis.
"Ferden og Kallet (The Journey & The Call)" - 5:50
"Da Vi Bygde Tårnet (When We Raised the Tower)" - 8:02
"Under Tårnets Skygge (Underneath the Shadow of the Tower)" - 5:49
"En Sirkel av Kosmisk Kaos (A Circle of Cosmic Chaos)" - 7:31
"Vandrerens Sang (The Song of the Wanderer)" - 8:00
"Den Bortdrevne Regnbuen (The Banished Rainbow)" - 5:40
"Trollmannens Krypt (The Crypt of the Wizard)" - 6:10
"Stjernefødt (Starborn)" - 4:54
"I Mørket Drømmende (In the Darkness Dreaming)" - 5:58
"Fanget i Krystal (Captured in Crystal)" - 3:37

Personnel
Mortiis: Vocals, All Instruments

Production
Arranged, Produced, Recorded, Engineered, Mixed & Mastered By Mortiis.
Layout by Dennis Ironmountain.

Reissues
 Released by Dark Dungeon Music in 1997 as a compilation album on LP and CD.
 Earache Records issued the CD with new cover artwork on 1 November 1999.
 Earache Records reissued the CD as part of a 3-CD set, along with Født til å Herske and The Stargate. Remastered by Mortiis and repackaged in a deluxe embossed slipcase, it included liner notes by Tommy Udo and featured the original artwork from the LP.

External links
"Crypt Of The Wizard" at discogs

1996 albums
Mortiis albums